Norwegian Wool is a luxury outerwear company based in New York.

History
Norwegian Wool was launched in 2014 by Michael Berkowitz as a men's outerwear brand. All of the coats are waterproof. The main manufacturing facility is located in Tuscany, just outside of Florence, Italy.

Berkowitz left his job as a physical commodities trader to start the company after looking for a particular type of coat and not being able to find one that he wanted on the market. Starting as just a hobby, he soon quit his job at the hedge fund to sell coats full time. Corporate headquarters are located in Midtown Manhattan.

References

American brands
Outdoor clothing brands
Clothing companies established in 2014
Clothing companies of the United States